The following is the complete So They Say discography.

Albums

Studio

EPs

Studio

Singles

Other appearances

Albums

Music videos

References

External links 
Official So They Say Website

Discographies of American artists
Rock music group discographies